The fight stick is a folk sport practised throughout the Canary Islands.

History 
The origins of lucha del garrote may date back to the aboriginal inhabitants of the islands prior to the Castilian conquest period of the early 15th century.

References

Sources

External links 

 https://commons.wikimedia.org/wiki/Lucha_del_garrote

Sport in the Canary Islands